Moisés Antonio Candelario (born 10 October 1978 in Guayaquil) is a retired international football player from Ecuador. He played as a defensive midfielder.

Club career
Candelario played most of his career for Emelec. Since 2006 he has played for a number of other teams in Ecuador.

External links
 
 Moisés Candelario at BDFA.com.ar 

1978 births
Living people
Sportspeople from Guayaquil
Ecuadorian footballers
Ecuador international footballers
1999 Copa América players
C.S. Emelec footballers
L.D.U. Quito footballers
Barcelona S.C. footballers
C.D. El Nacional footballers
L.D.U. Portoviejo footballers

Association football midfielders